Folusz may refer to the following places:
Folusz, Greater Poland Voivodeship (west-central Poland, near Gniezno)
Folusz, Podlaskie Voivodeship (north-east Poland)
Folusz, Subcarpathian Voivodeship (south-east Poland)